Vilémov is a market town in Havlíčkův Brod District in the Vysočina Region of the Czech Republic. It has about 1,000 inhabitants.

Administrative parts
Villages of Dálčice, Hostovlice, Jakubovice, Klášter, Košťany, Spytice, Ždánice and Zhoř are administrative parts of Vilémov.

Etymology
The name is derived from Abbot Vilém, who was one of the founders of Vilémov.

Geography
It lies in the Upper Sázava Hills. It is situated on the small river Hostačovka. The Doubravka brook, a tributary of the Hostačovka, forms the eastern municipal border.

History

Vilémov was founded by Benedictines in 1119 and consisted of a monastery complex and a fortified settlement. In 1278 the monastery was burned down by the troops of King Rudolf I of Germany and in 1421 the monastery was conquered by the Hussites. The monks then fled to Uherčice and the convent was never restored here.

In 1469, armies of Matthias Corvinus and George of Poděbrady clashed near Vilémov during the Bohemian–Hungarian War (1468–1478).

In 1578, a fortress was built on the foundations of the monastery buildings. A hundred years later, it was rebuilt into a Renaissance castle. In 1684, Vilémov was bought by Count Caretto de Millessimo. He and his family had rebuilt the castle in the Baroque style. They owned the castle until 1852. From 1852 until the confiscation during the World War II, it was owned by the Rajský of Dubnice family.

In 1747, Maria Theresa promoted Vilémov to a market town. In 2006, Vilémov has restored the market town status.

Sights
Klášter Castle was returned to the Rajský of Dubnice family in 1991 and i s in private ownership since then. The dilapidated building has been renovated by the family and now serves as a hotel and restaurant.

The Baroque Church of Saint Wenceslaus dates from 1726. Its predecessor was a Gothic church consecrated to the Virgin Mary, which served as a parish church of the monastery.

Notable people
Stanislav Vydra (1741–1804), priest, writer and mathematician; worked here
Karel Styblo (1921–1998), Czech-Dutch physician

References

External links

Populated places in Havlíčkův Brod District
Market towns in the Czech Republic